The following is a list of episodes of the Italian television series RIS Delitti Imperfetti. Season 1 features 12 episodes, seasons 2–3 feature 16 episodes each and season 4–8 feature 20 episodes each. Season 1 aired from January 11 to February 16, 2005. , season 2 from January 9 to February 20, 2006. , season 3 from January 15 to February 20, 2007. , season 4 from January 17 to March 20, 2008. , season 5 from January 13 to March 18, 2009. , season 6 from March 18 to May 20, 2010. , season 7 from March 22 to May 24, 2011. and season 8 from October 3 to November 28, 2012.

RIS Delitti Imperfetti concluded after 8 seasons and 144 episodes running.

Overview

Episodes

Season 1 (2005)

Season 2 (2006)

Season 3 (2007)

Season 4 (2008)

Season 5 (2009.)

1.
2. The dangerous books
3. The sharp shooter
4. The last side
5. The book of the cult
6. The romantic woman
7. Self-defense
8. The relations
9. The defense of the homes
10. The road network
11. The shadow of his father
12. Blood sailing
13. The private justice
14. The lesson
15. That what is significantly is not visible to the naked eye
16. The lead mistakes
17. The life killers
18. The melodrama
19. The secret cults
20. The step from the end

Season 6 (2010.)

1. SPQR
2. The angel of death
3. The suicide letter
4. The secret of the golden tomb
5. The eye doesn't see
6. The end of the run
7. The Avenger
8. Who killed Santa Clause?
9. The first and the last
10. The crime of the veiled lady 
11. The first blood
12. The family on the reunion
13. The Lucifer's effect
14. The past is coming back
15. The flaring man
16. The fire from the sky
17. The judgment day
18. Hackers and crackers
19. The miracles
20. The end of the game

Season 7 (2011.)

1. In the protection of own home
2. The wolf's gang
3. Sayonara
4. Over the mask
5. The fall in the disgrace
6. 2012
7. The rabbit's day
8. The wolf's voice
9. The sixth man
10. For the handful of coins
11. In the Stinco's foots
12. The secret dolls
13. The bones
14. The spektekl of cruelty
15. The beloved sister
16. The vampires in the Rome
17. I love you
18. The guinea pigs
19. The end
20. The last chance

Season 8 (2012.)

1. The wolf's return
2. More ruthless than ever
3. Crack, you're dead
4. Clandesstino on the ship
5. Sasso's case
6. The fish called ball
7. In the body's absence
8. The declaration
9. The corridors of power
10. The deadly tattoo
11. In one way
12. The last confession
13. The purchase from the captain
14. Save Lara
15. The secret identity
16. I wrote it
17. The scorpion's bite
18. The lab rats
19. The search for the guns
20. Till the end

References

External links (in Italian)
List of RIS Delitti Imperfetti episodes (1st season)
List of RIS Delitti Imperfetti episodes (2nd season)
List of RIS Delitti Imperfetti episodes (3rd season)
List of RIS Delitti Imperfetti episodes (4th season)
Official website

RIS Delitti Imperfetti